The Metro Busway system consists of two bus rapid transit routes in Los Angeles County, California, operated by the Los Angeles County Metropolitan Transportation Authority (Metro). The bus rapid transit lines which compose the Metro Busway network include the G Line and the J Line. The Metro Busway network operates on dedicated busways, shared-use busways and streets.

Lines

Stations 
The following table lists all stations served by Metro Busway lines (Metro G and J Lines). The list does not include Metro J line street stops.

References

Silver Line images

External links
G Line homepage — with route map; and current schedules.
J Line homepage — with route map; and current schedules.

 01
Metro Busway stations
Metro Busway stations
Metro Busway stations
Metro Busway stations